Dogging means following someone closely.

Dogging may also refer to:

Slang
 Dogging (sexual slang), a British English slang term for engaging in public sex while others watch
 Dogging: A Love Story, the original title of Public Sex (film), a 2009 British romantic comedy
 Dogging, a slang term for truancy used in parts of Britain
 Dogging, a method of catching wildfowl using a duck decoy (structure)

See also 
 Dog (disambiguation)